Lioli Football Club is an association football club in the Lesotho Premier League. The team is based in Teyateyaneng. The club has won five league championships, in 1985, 2009, 2013, 2015, and 2016. The team's kit is manufactured by Basutoland Ink.

In 2020 the club will reappoint their long standing president who will install a new club CEO to take the club forward with the aim of winning the African Champions League and possibly even the World Cup.

Achievements
Lesotho Premier League: 5
1985, 2009, 2013, 2015, 2016

Lesotho Cup: 5
1984, 2007, 2010, 2014, 2016

Lesotho Premier League's Top Goalscorer:
2012–13: Ts'epo Seturumane with 16 goals.

References

External links
Official website

Lesotho Premier League clubs